Wichita State University (WSU) is a public research university in Wichita, Kansas, United States. It is governed by the Kansas Board of Regents. The university offers more than 60 undergraduate degree programs in more than 200 areas of study in six colleges. The university's graduate school offers 44 master's degrees in more than 100 areas and a specialist in education degree. It is classified among "R2: Doctoral Universities – High research activity".

Wichita State University also hosts classes at four satellite locations: WSU West in Maize, WSU South in Derby, and the WSU Downtown Center that houses the university's Center for Community Support & Research, the Department of Physician Assistant, and the Department of Physical Therapy. A quarter-mile northeast of campus, the Advanced Education in General Dentistry building, built in 2011, houses classrooms and a dental clinic. It is adjacent to the university's  Eugene M. Hughes Metropolitan Complex, where many of WSU noncredit courses are taught.

History

Wichita State University began in 1886 as a private Congregational preparatory school, founded by Rev. Joseph Homer Parker. Initially it was referred to as "Young Ladies College", "Wichita Ladies College", and "Congregational Female College". It was founded during a boom in college and university creation and it was envisioned to admit women twelve years and older who were "able to read, write, spell and recite the parts of speech." In early 1887, the project's leaders received a land parcel from the developers of the adjacent Fairmount Neighborhood and in response, renamed their school Fairmount College.  Envisioned to be the "Vassar of the West," the streets of the neighboring neighborhoods were named after prominent women's colleges including Vassar and Holyoke. Support came mainly from the Plymouth Congregational Church to build it, but the school never opened its doors. In 1892, a corporation bought the property and named the preparatory school Fairmount Institute. It opened in September to men and women, with an emphasis on training in preaching or teaching. It closed because of financial difficulties.

In 1895, on the same site, Fairmount College opened collegiate classes for men and women with funding by the Congregational Education Society.  The society selected Nathan Morrison to be the president of the new college. During the 1900s and 1910s, the school grew with structures including a men's dormitory, Fiske Hall, begun in 1904 and dedicated June 1906, and a Carnegie library, built in 1908.  The school's mascot, the "wheatshockers," came about during a football game in 1906 and referred to the fact that many of the football players also shocked wheat during the harvest.

Amid growing financial troubles in the 1920s, the college's supporters tried to get the city of Wichita to buy it in 1925, but failed. A second referendum passed in 1926, and that fall it became the Municipal University of Wichita (popularly known as "Wichita University" or "WU"). It was the first municipal university west of the Mississippi, and catered to students of limited means.

By the 1950s, university leaders and President Harry Corbin explored adding the institution to the State of Kansas Regents System along with the University of Kansas and Kansas State University.  These two schools had powerful friends who did not feel that the University of Wichita was on par with the state's two main universities.  It took a concerted lobbying effort on the part of WU boosters to persuade the legislature and governor to agree to the change. On July 1, 1964, the school officially entered the state system of higher education as Wichita State University (WSU).

Located on campus is the original building of the first Pizza Hut.  The original building was located at Kellogg and Bluff.  An effort to move it out of the path of Kellogg expansion resulted in the building coming to Wichita State University in the 1980s.  After three decades of being located near the campus water tower, the building underwent a second move. In the 2010s, the university moved it to its current location on the Innovation Campus.

Campuses 
The Main Campus is located at 1845 North Fairmount in northeast Wichita, is mostly bounded between the streets of 17th St N, 21st St N, Hillside St, Oliver Ave.

The campus includes the Edwin A. Ulrich Museum of Art.

WSU has six satellite locations:
 WSU West is located at 3801 North Walker in Maize, Kansas. This 9 acre (3.6 ha) campus hosts 80 to 100 university classes each academic semester.
 WSU South is located at 3821 East Harry Street, Suite B105 in Wichita. This campus began offering Wichita State University coursework in January 2008 at its original location at 200 West Greenway in Derby, Kansas before moving to its current location on July 1, 2018.
 WSU Haysville is located at 106 Stewart Ave in Haysville, Kansas.
 WSU Old Town - A is located at 238 N. Mead in downtown Wichita.
 WSU Old Town - B is located at 213 N. Mead in downtown Wichita.
 WSU Old Town - C is located at 121 N. Mead in downtown Wichita.

Since July 1, 2018, the Campus of Applied Sciences and Technology, also known as "WSU Tech" and formerly known as the Wichita Area Technical College, is located at 4004 N. Webb Road in Wichita.

Research
WSU is one of three research institutions in the state of Kansas, along with Kansas State University (KSU) and the University of Kansas (KU).

Research facilities include:
 National Institute for Aviation Research, which has multiple facilities:
 Aircraft Structural Test and Evaluation Center (ASTEC) in the former Kansas Coliseum near Park City.
 Advanced Technologies Lab for Aerospace Systems (ATLAS), a manufacturing research lab
 Virtual Engineering & Flight Laboratory
 Crash Dynamics Laboratory
 Walter H. Beech Wind Tunnel
 Biology research labs (Hubbard Hall)
 Chemistry research labs (McKinley Hall)
 Physics research labs (Jabara Hall)
 WSU Field Station
 Innovation Campus

Academics

The university comprises the following academic colleges and schools:
 College of Applied Studies (formerly College of Education)
 College of Engineering
 College of Fine Arts
 College of Health Professions
 Dorothy and Bill Cohen Honors College
 Fairmount College of Liberal Arts and Sciences
 Graduate School
 Institute for Interdisciplinary Innovation
 W. Frank Barton School of Business

Wichita State University was ranked the 52nd top college in the United States in 2014 by the Social Mobility Index college rankings. Wichita State is placed among National Universities in the United States in rankings done by U.S. News & World Report. For all engineering research and development expenditures, WSU ranked No. 27 in the US for year 2021, with $109 million Wichita State University is ranked third among all U.S. universities in money spent on aerospace research and development, with $105 million in expenditures and No. 1 in industry-funded aerospace R&D. Wichita State's W. Frank Barton School of Business was listed in The Princeton Review 2011 "301 Best Business Schools," ranked as the 11th best program in the country for students seeking an undergraduate degree in entrepreneurship for 2007. In 2021, the Department of Engineering Technology was recognized as one of three academic programs in the United States endorsed by the Advanced Robotics for Manufacturing consortium in its inaugural endorsement program launch.

The Aerospace Engineering department was founded in 1928 and has longstanding collaborative relationships with Airbus North America, Boeing, Bombardier-Learjet, Cessna, Hawker Beechcraft, Spirit AeroSystems, and other Wichita aviation concerns. The department teaches in the areas of composites, structures, Engineering mechanics, computational Fluid dynamics, applied Aerodynamics, and Flight simulation. Students can readily do internships at the nearby airports and many airplane companies like Cessna, Learjet, etc.

The Wichita State University Libraries have holdings of more than 2 million volumes, over 350 electronic databases and more than 70,000 journal subscriptions. The University Libraries consist of the main Ablah Library, the McKinley Chemistry Library, the Thurlow Lieurance Music Library and University Libraries Special Collections and University Archives. The libraries are open to community users and serve as a regional United States Federal Government Documents Depository, a State of Kansas Government Documents Depository, and is the State of Kansas' only Patents and Trademarks Library. WSU Special Collections and University Archives contains numerous rare books, incunabula, historical manuscripts collections, maps and photographic archives documenting Kansas history, as well as hosting the Wichita Photo Archives. The library faculty offer workshops throughout the year to students and community members.

In 2014, President John Bardo announced plans to launch a major academic and student life initiative, dubbed the "Innovation Campus." The plan kicked off with the completion of renovations to the university's student union, the Rhatigan Student Center, and the opening of Shocker Hall, a new 318,000-square-foot, 784-bed housing facility on the main campus. It includes public/private partnerships with domestic and international companies that would build offices on the WSU main campus and collaborate with the students and faculty on research projects and product development through a technology transfer system. The university has secured partnerships with three companies: Wichita-based ABI Group of Companies; Sunnyvale, Calif.-based NetApp; and the Indian IT firm Tech Mahindra. The plan calls for the addition of more than 20 new buildings, including Woolsey Hall, a new building for the Frank W. Barton School of Business, a new residence hall, commercial offices, "creative collision" facilities, two mixed-use developments and a hotel. Ground broke on the first building, the Technology Transfer/Experiential Learning Building, in Q1 2015. The development is taking place on the site of the former Braeburn Golf Course adjacent to campus, a WSU-owned course which closed in November 2014.

President John Bardo's executive team passed a tobacco-free campus policy in August 2016. In 2017, the university, all of its satellite campuses and all WSU-owned properties became tobacco free. The ban applies to all tobacco products including smokeless tobacco, oral tobacco and electronic cigarettes.  It does not apply to products that deliver nicotine for the purpose of cessation, or to tobacco used in controlled research or for educational, clinical or religious ceremonial purposes.  Smoking was still allowed in designated areas outside of WSU-ICAA controlled athletic facilities and within designated areas of the WSU Innovation Campus.

Wichita State University has been dynamically growing and changing over the years—with buildings including: the Steve Clark YMCA and Student Wellness Center, and The Flats. As the university is nationally renowned, Airbus and Spirit Aerosystems have also decided to move their locations to Wichita State. On the eastern half of the campus stands the John Bardo Center, and Hyatt Place. Woolsley Hall, the future home of the Barton School of Business—will be completed in mid-2022.

Student life

Greek organizations
Recognized fraternities and sororities at the university include:

Athletics

The Wichita State (WSU) athletic teams are called the Shockers. The university is a member of the NCAA Division I ranks, primarily competing in the American Athletic Conference (AAC) since the 2017–18 academic year. The Shockers previously competed in the D-I Missouri Valley Conference (MVC) from 1945–46 to 2016–17; as an Independent from 1940–41 to 1944–45; in the Central Intercollegiate Athletic Conference (CIC) from 1923–24 to 1939–40; and in the Kansas Collegiate Athletic Conference (KIAC) of the National Association of Intercollegiate Athletics (NAIA) from 1902–03 to 1922–23.

WSU competes in 15 intercollegiate athletic teams: Men's sports include baseball, basketball, cross country, golf, tennis and track & field (indoor and outdoor); while women's sports include basketball, cross country, golf, softball, tennis, track & field (indoor and outdoor) and volleyball. Also, it offers club sports such as crew, bowling, shooting sports, and other intramural sports.

Baseball
The men's baseball team is college baseball's highest winning team for the past 31 years, with numerous conference championships and NCAA tournament appearances. The baseball team won the national championship in 1989 and was runner-up in 1982, 1991 and 1993. They play at Eck Stadium.

Men's basketball
The men's basketball team has played in the NCAA tournament 16 times since 1954, advancing to the Final Four in 1965 and 2013, the Elite Eight in 1981, and the Sweet Sixteen in 2006 and 2015, and also entering the 2014 NCAA tournament unbeaten. The team also won the 2011 National Invitation Tournament Championship, beating the Alabama Crimson Tide. The Shockers have two alumni currently playing in the NBA in Fred VanVleet and Landry Shamet. Other Wichita State products who have played in the league include All-Star Xavier McDaniel, power forwards Antoine Carr, Cliff Levingston, Cleanthony Early, two-time All-American Dave Stallworth, center Gene Wiley, guards Gal Mekel, Toure' Murry, Ron Baker, and Greg Dreiling. Four-time All-American Cleo Littleton joined the Shocks in 1951, breaking the unofficial color barrier in the Missouri Valley Conference.

Bowling
The men's and women's bowling teams have won numerous USBC Intercollegiate Team Championships, including the men's 2003, 2008, 2009 and 2010 title and the women's 2005, 2007 and 2009 title.

Track and field
Shocker Track and Field History: Seven Olympians. Two National Champions. 60 NCAA All-Americans. Under Steve Rainbolt (2001–2012): 14 Missouri Valley Conference Championship Teams. 29 NCAA All-Americans.

Cross country
Men's Cross Country: Established in 1947. Eight Missouri Valley Conference titles, five consecutive (1971–75). Five NCAA All-Americans. Nine Missouri Valley Conference Champions. 46 All-MVC award winners.

Women's Cross Country: Established in 1983. 10 Missouri Valley Conference titles, six consecutive (2005–10). Four NCAA All-Americans. Six Missouri Valley Conference Champions. 56 All-MVC award winners.

Football
The school discontinued its football program following the 1986 season due to poor attendance, financial red ink, NCAA recruiting violations, and the state of disrepair of Cessna Stadium. It had never fully recovered from losing 16 starters, its athletic director, football coach and many others critical to the WSU program in a plane crash in 1970 (see below). Legendary NFL coach Bill Parcells was a linebacker at WSU in 1962 and 1963 before serving as a graduate assistant in 1964. Wichita State University was also the first Division I-A school to hire a black head coach in college football, Willie Jeffries, in 1979.

Shockers
The name for WSU's athletic teams is the Shockers and students are also collectively referred to as "Shockers." The name reflects the University's heritage: Early students earned money by shocking, or harvesting, wheat in nearby fields. Early football games were played on a stubbled wheat field. Pep club members were known as Wheaties. Tradition has it that in 1904, football manager and student R.J. Kirk came up with the nickname Wheatshockers. Although the Wheatshockers name was never officially adopted by the university, it caught on and survived until it was later shortened to Shockers. Until 1948, the university used a nameless shock of wheat as its symbol. WuShock came to life when junior Wilbur Elsea won the Kappa Pi honorary society's competition to design a mascot typifying the spirit of the school. Elsea, who had been a Marine during World War II, decided that "the school needed a mascot who gave a tough impression, with a serious, no-nonsense scowl."

Once Elsea's mascot was adopted by the university, which by that time was known as the Municipal University of Wichita, all that was needed was a name. The October 7, 1948, issue of The Sunflower, the student newspaper, ran an advertisement urging students to submit names for the school's new mascot. It was freshman Jack Kersting who suggested the winning name, "WuShock."

In 1998, WuShock, also referred to as "Wu," marked his 50th birthday by undergoing a redesign and getting a pumped-up physique and revved-up attitude. The mascot's costume has changed over the years, as well. With the redesign, a new costume was introduced in fall 1998. In fall 1999, the head of the new costume underwent another redesign after a number of supporters suggested the mascot needed a more intimidating look. In 2006 it was decided to once again update the Wu costume. The general consensus was that many wanted the costume to more accurately reflect the depiction of WU in the school's logo. The new WuShock now has the ability to run, jump, and walk up stairs without help. Many officials feel that a more professional and intimidating mascot on the field will certainly bolster WSU's image.

Football team plane crash

On October 2, 1970, a plane carrying players and staff of the WSU football team took off from a Colorado airport after refueling and was bound for Logan, Utah for a game against Utah State University. It was the first, or "gold" plane, the twin to a second black plane. President Richard Nixon sent the president of the university a note which read, "Our thoughts and prayers go out to you in this time of sorrow." A monument exists to the south of Memorial Drive on the Wichita State Campus to commemorate those who died.

Notable alumni and faculty

WSU has produced multiple notable businessmen, including the founders of Pizza Hut Dan and Frank Carney, Garmin founder Gary Burrell, and Phil Ruffin (did not graduate), Notable athletes include basketball players Antoine Carr and Fred VanVleet, Pro Football Hall of Fame coach Bill Parcells, and professional wrestler Paul Wight who played basketball at the school but transferred out. Serial killer Dennis Rader, also known as "BTK", graduated from WSU as well.

Notes

References

Further reading

 Standing Proudly on the Hill : A Pictorial History of Wichita State University 1895-1995; WSU Centennial Committee; 48 pages; 1995. (abstract) (download)
 Uncloistered Halls : The Centennial History of Wichita State University (1895-1995); Craig Miner; WSU Endowment Association; 360 pages; 1995. (abstract) (download)
 An Act of Faith (1955-1984); Melvin H Witrogen, Dennis Duell, Jimmy Skaggs; WSU Board of Trustees; 90 pages; 1984. (abstract) (download) - history of the struggle to bring the University of Wichita into the state university system
 A History of Fairmount College (1895-1926); John Rydjord; Regents Press of Kansas; 251 pages; 1977; . (abstract) (download)
 A History of the College of Engineering at Wichita State University (1920s-1990s); Melvin Snyder; 66 pages; 1996. (abstract)

External links

 
 Wichita State athletics website

 
Educational institutions established in 1895
Tourist attractions in Wichita, Kansas
Buildings and structures in Wichita, Kansas
1895 establishments in Kansas
Public universities and colleges in Kansas